Grand Bay West is a settlement in Newfoundland and Labrador.

Populated places in Newfoundland and Labrador